The Council of the Nation  is the upper house of the Algerian Parliament. It is composed of 144 members, 2/3 of which are elected indirectly and 1/3 of which are appointed by the president of Algeria.

Abdelkader Bensalah was elected as President of the Council of the Nation on July 2, 2002, re-elected on January 11, 2007 and January 10, 2008.
Zohra Drif was elected as Vice President of the Council of the Nation on September 10, 2002, re-elected on March 7, 2007 and March 8, 2008.

They were last elected on 5 February 2022.

Composition
The Council has 144 members:
96 indirectly elected in secret ballot (2/3)
48 appointed by the President of the Republic (1/3)

Elections
There are 48 dual-member constituencies (two seats) corresponding to the number of wilayas (departments) of the country.

The election shall be by majority vote in two rounds by and from an electoral college composed of elected popular wilaya assemblies and communal people's assemblies (approx. 15,000 members).

Eligibility:
be at least 40 years old.
The term of office is six years. The Chamber is renewed by half every three years.

Board member commits himself before his peers who can revoke his mandate by a majority of its members, if it commits a shameful action for his mission.

Presidency
President: Salah Goudjil
Vice President: Djamel Ould Abbes

Building

See also
List of presidents of the Council of the Nation (Algeria)
Politics of Algeria
Parliament of Algeria
People's National Assembly
List of legislatures by country

References

External links
 Official website

Politics of Algeria
Algeria
1997 establishments in Algeria